Bacca (Latin for berry) may refer to:

A simple, indehiscent, fleshy fruit
Purpura bacca, fruit of the açaí palm
Bacca, a tag game, see British Bulldog (game)
Bacca, character in Star Wars: Knights of the Old Republic
Bacca (English), Short form of tobacco.
Bacca (surname)

See also
Baca (disambiguation)
Bača (disambiguation)
Backa (disambiguation)